Julie Johnson may refer to:
Julie Johnson (film), a 2001 independent American drama film
Julie Johnson (actress), country singer and actress
Julie Johnson (politician), American politician from Texas
Julie A. Johnson, American clinical pharmacist
Julie Howard, married name Johnson, former Canadian swimmer
Julie Johnson, murder victim, see List of people executed in South Carolina

See also
Julie Johnston (disambiguation)
Julia Johnson, singer-songwriter